John Thomas Howarth  (1899–unknown) was an English footballer who played as a full-back. Born in Darwen, Lancashire, he began his career with his hometown club, Darwen F.C., before moving to Manchester United in May 1921 in a £750 joint transfer that also brought George Haslam to Old Trafford. He made his debut in January 1922 in a 3–0 away defeat to Sheffield United, playing alongside Charlie Radford in the absence of Jack Silcock. Howarth played three more games that season, this time with Silcock in place of Radford, including a 3–2 win in the return fixture against Sheffield United. Manchester United were relegated at the end of the season, but although they used 29 players in the Second Division in 1922–23, Howarth never played for the club again. He was transfer-listed at the end of the season, but was reported to still be without a club by the start of the 1927–28 season.

References

External links
Profile at StretfordEnd.co.uk
Profile at MUFCInfo.com

1899 births
Year of death missing
People from Darwen
English footballers
Association football fullbacks
Darwen F.C. players
Manchester United F.C. players